The men's 200 metres at the 1984 Summer Olympics in Los Angeles, California had an entry list of 76 competitors from 58 nations, with ten qualifying heats (76), four quarterfinals (32), and two semifinals (16) before the final (8) took off on Wednesday August 8, 1984. The maximum number of athletes per nation had been set at 3 since the 1930 Olympic Congress. The event was won by Carl Lewis of the United States, the nation's first victory in the men's 200 metres since 1968 and 13th overall. It was the third gold medal of the Games for Lewis, who was attempting to match Jesse Owens in winning the 100, 200, long jump, and 4x100 relay; his victory in this event left only the relay to go, in which the United States was heavily favored. The American team competed a medal sweep in this event, the first since 1956 and the fifth overall for the United States, with Kirk Baptiste earning silver and Thomas Jefferson taking bronze.

Background

This was the 19th appearance of the event, which was not held at the first Olympics in 1896 but has been on the program ever since. Two of the eight finalists from the 1980 Games returned: gold medalist (and 1972 bronze medalist and 1976 finalist) Pietro Mennea of Italy and bronze medalist (and 1976 gold medalist) Don Quarrie of Jamaica. The favorite was Carl Lewis of the United States, attempting to win four golds, with his teammates Kirk Baptiste and Thomas Jefferson his biggest challengers. The Soviet-led boycott had little effect on this event, with none of the top 200 metres runners in 1984 being from boycotting nations.

Algeria, Bangladesh, the British Virgin Islands, the People's Republic of China, Costa Rica, Equatorial Guinea, The Gambia, Indonesia, Mali, Mauritius, the Netherlands Antilles, Oman, Qatar, Swaziland, and Zimbabwe each made their debut in the event. The United States made its 18th appearance, most of any nation, having missed only the boycotted 1980 Games.

Competition format

The competition used the four round format introduced in 1920: heats, quarterfinals, semifinals, and a final. The "fastest loser" system introduced in 1960 was used in the heats.

There were 10 heats of 8 runners each (before withdrawals), with the top 3 men in each advancing to the quarterfinals along with the next 2 fastest overall. The quarterfinals consisted of 4 heats of 8 athletes each (again, before withdrawals); the 4 fastest men in each heat advanced to the semifinals. There were 2 semifinals, each with 8 runners. Again, the top 4 athletes advanced. The final had 8 runners. The races were run on a 400 metre track.

Records

These were the standing world and Olympic records (in seconds) prior to the 1984 Summer Olympics.

In the final Carl Lewis set a new Olympic record with 19.80 seconds.

Schedule

All times are Pacific Daylight Time (UTC-7)

Results

Heats

Heat 1

Heat 2

Heat 3

Heat 4

Heat 5

Heat 6

Heat 7

Heat 8

Heat 9

Heat 10

Quarterfinals

Quarterfinal 1

Quarterfinal 2

Quarterfinal 3

Quarterfinal 4

Semifinals

Semifinal 1

Semifinal 2

Final

See also
 1980 Men's Olympic 200 metres (Moscow)
 1982 Men's European Championships 200 metres (Athens)
 1983 Men's World Championships 200 metres (Helsinki)
 1984 Friendship Games 200 metres (Moscow)
 1986 Men's European Championships 200 metres (Stuttgart)
 1987 Men's World Championships 200 metres (Rome)
 1988 Men's Olympic 200 metres (Seoul)

References

External links
  Results

2
200 metres at the Olympics
Men's events at the 1984 Summer Olympics